Carlos Caballero (born 15 February 1927) is a Colombian former weightlifter who competed in the 1956 Summer Olympics and in the 1960 Summer Olympics.

References

1927 births
Living people
Colombian male weightlifters
Olympic weightlifters of Colombia
Weightlifters at the 1956 Summer Olympics
Weightlifters at the 1960 Summer Olympics
Place of birth missing (living people)
20th-century Colombian people
21st-century Colombian people